Governor Fleming may refer to:

Aretas B. Fleming (1839–1923), 8th Governor of West Virginia
Francis Fleming (1842–1922), Governor of the Leeward Islands from 1895 to 1901
Francis P. Fleming (1841–1908), 15th Governor of Florida
William Fleming (governor) (1729–1795), 3rd Governor of Virginia